Sander Arends and David Pel were the defending champions but chose not to defend their title.

Karol Drzewiecki and Sergio Martos Gornés won the title after defeating Fernando Romboli and Jan Zieliński 6–4, 4–6, [10–3] in the final.

Seeds

Draw

References

External links
 Main draw

Rafa Nadal Open - Doubles